The Cinema of Benin refers to the film industry of the Republic of Benin in West Africa.

History

Sources differ as to the which was the first Beninese film, with some pointing to the short Lumière des hommes (1954, director unknown), with others pointing to the work of Pascal Abikanlou, who made a number of documentaries in the 1960s, followed by his first feature film Sous le signe du vaudou in 1974. Richard De Medeiros was another noted director of the early independence years, beginning with 1970's Le roi est mort en exil, an examination of Béhanzin, the last king of Dahomey. He went on to make the feature-length Le nouveau venu (1972), which explored the issue of corruption and the conflict between modernity and tradition in Benin. François Okioh made a number of short documentaries in the 1980s, as well as the feature-length dramas Ironou (1985) and Enfants de... (1985). Noted filmmakers of the last two decades are Jean Odoutan (Barbecue Pejo, 2000; Pim-Pim Tché, 2010), Idrissou Mora Kpai (Si-Gueriki, la reine-mère, 2002) and Sylvestre Amoussou (Africa Paradis, 2006).

List of Beninese films

This is a sortable list of films produced in Benin.

See also

Culture of Benin
List of African films

References

External links
 Benin film  at the Internet Movie Database

 
Films
 
Benin
Benin